Kemallı can refer to:

 Kemallı, Ezine
 Kemallı, Kızılırmak
 Kemalli, Sungurlu